Otto Kurz FBA (26 May 1908 in Vienna, Austria – 3 September 1975 in London) was a historian and Slade Professor of Fine Art, University of Oxford.

Education
 University of Vienna

Career
Fleeing to London from the Nazis, he was Librarian at the Warburg Institute, 1944–65 and Professor of the History of Classical Tradition with special reference to the Near East, University of London, 1965–75. He was Slade Professor of Fine Art at the University of Oxford for 1971–72.

Honours
 He was Visiting Lecturer, Hebrew University, Jerusalem, 1964, and 1973
 He was elected a Fellow of the British Academy, 1962.
 Honorary Fellow: Associazione Francesco Francia, Bologna; Raccolta Vinciana, Milan; Accademia Clementina, Bologna.

References 

 Who was Who

1908 births
1975 deaths
Austrian art historians
Jewish historians
20th-century Austrian historians
Fellows of the British Academy
Academics of the University of London
Slade Professors of Fine Art (University of Oxford)
People associated with the Warburg Institute
Jewish emigrants from Austria to the United Kingdom after the Anschluss
British expatriates in Israel
Writers from Vienna
20th-century British historians